Edward McClellan Cummins (July 25, 1886 – November 21, 1926) was an American golfer who competed in the 1904 Summer Olympics. In 1904 he was part of the American team which won the gold medal. He finished 25th in this competition. In the individual competition he finished 25th in the qualification and was eliminated in the first round of the match play.

References

External links
 Profile

American male golfers
Amateur golfers
Golfers at the 1904 Summer Olympics
Olympic gold medalists for the United States in golf
Medalists at the 1904 Summer Olympics
1886 births
1926 deaths
19th-century American people
20th-century American people